Manolis Xexakis (born 1948 in Rethymnon, Crete) is a Greek poet and prose writer. He studied physics and mathematics at the University of Thessaloniki. He has worked as a journalist, teacher, and also in advertising.

Poetry
Ασκήσεις Μαθηματικών (Math Exercises), 1980
Πλόες ερωτικοί (Erotic Sea Ways), 1980
Κάτοπτρα μελαγχολικού λόγου (Mirrors of Melancholic Word), 1987

Prose
Ο θάνατος του ιππικού (The Death of the Cavalry), 1977
Πού κούκος; Πού άνεμος; (Where the Cuckoo? Where the Wind?), 1987
Σονάτα κομπολογιών (A String of Beads Sonata), 2000

External links
His page at the website of the Hellenic Authors' Society (Greek)

Notes

Cretan poets
1948 births
Living people
People from Rethymno